Captain Nathan Hale is a bronze statue of Nathan Hale, by Bela Lyon Pratt. It is located at the south facade of the Robert F. Kennedy Department of Justice Building, 10th Street and Constitution Avenue, Northwest, Washington, D.C.

The statue was given to the United States government in 1945 by American antiquarian George Dudley Seymour. This example was cast around 1930, and dedicated on April 18, 1948.

The original is at Yale University, and other examples are at Fort Nathan Hale, the Chicago Tribune Tower, and CIA headquarters.

The inscription reads:
(Sculpture, near figure's proper left foot:) 
B.L. PRATT 
(Sculpture, near figure's proper right foot:) 
REPLICA OF THAT
AT YALE UNIVERSITY 
(Sculpture, around bottom rim:) 
I ONLY REGRET THAT I HAVE BUT ONE LIFE TO LOSE FOR MY COUNTRY 
(Base, front:) 

signed Founder's mark appears

As part of American Revolution Statuary in Washington, D.C. the statue at the Department of Justice Building is listed on the National Register of Historic Places.

Gallery

See also
 List of public art in Chicago
 List of public art in Washington, D.C., Ward 6

References

External links
 

1915 sculptures
Bronze sculptures in Washington, D.C.
Historic district contributing properties in Washington, D.C.
Hale
Outdoor sculptures in Chicago
Outdoor sculptures in Washington, D.C.
Outdoor sculptures in Connecticut
Federal Triangle
Nathan Hale